The following is a non-exhaustive list of notable compositions for the harp.

Solo works

Elias Parish Alvars
Introduction, Cadenza & Rondo
La Mandoline, Op.84
Fantaisie sur Lucia di Lammermoor
Lucia di Lammermoor Fantasia No. 2, Op 79
Fantasia on Themes from Oberon
Grand Study in Imitation of the Mandoline
"Hebrew Air", from Voyage No. 3
"Chanson grec", from Voyage No. 6
"Sultan's Parade", from Voyage No. 3
La Danse des fées, Op 76
Marche favorite du Sultan
"Prayer" from Mosè in Egitto
Serenade, Op. 83
Romance No. 1
Romance No. 2
over 80 pieces
Carl Philipp Emanuel Bach
Sonata for Harp in G major, Wq.139
Ludwig van Beethoven
Six Variations on a Swiss Song, WoO 64 (for harp or piano, composed before 1793)
Luciano Berio
Sequenza II (1963)
François-Adrien Boieldieu
Harp Sonata (1795)
Nimrod Borenstein
Etude Poème opus 8 (1995)
 Nocturne opus 46 (2007)
Benjamin Britten
Suite for Harp (1969)
A Ceremony of Carols (harp accompanies SSA choir)
Canticle V: The Death of Saint Narcissus (harp accompanies tenor)
A Birthday Hansel (harp accompanies high voice)
David Bruce (composer)
Caja de Musica (2009)
Howard J. Buss
Awakening (2010)
Vega of Lyra "The Harp Star" (2013)
 Gary Schocker (b. 1959) 
 Garden in Harp
Garrett Byrnes (b. 1971)
Valley of Butterflies (2011)
Sizzle (2009)
Amhrán Slán (2001)
Visions in Twilight (2000)
André Caplet
Déchiffrage (1910)
Divertissement à la française (1924)
Divertissement à l'espagnole (1924)
Elliott Carter
Bariolage (1992)
Julian Cochran
Four Preludes and Nocturne for Concert Harp
Two Valses for Concert Harp
Gilad Cohen
Doaa and Masa (2016)
David Conte
Marian Variations (2006)
Carson Cooman
Sun Figment for Harp (2002)
Jean-Michel Damase
Aubade
Introduction et Toccata
Pluie
Sarabande
Sicilienne variée
Tango pour harpe
Thème et variations
Thirty Etudes
Jan Ladislav Dussek
Sonata with 'The Lass of Richmond Hill' in F, C. 183 (c.1800)
Three Sonatas (1797), possibly by Sophia Dussek
No. 1 in B flat, C. 12
No. 2 in G, C. 13
No. 3 in C minor, C. 14
Six Sonatinas (1799), definitely by J.L. Dussek
No. 1 in C, C. 160
No. 2 in F, C. 161
No. 3 in G, C. 162
No. 4 in B flat, C. 163
No. 5 in F, C. 164
No. 6 in E flat, C. 165
Gabriel Fauré
Impromptu, Op. 86 (1904)
Une châtelaine en sa tour, Op. 110 (1918)
Graham Fitkin
Skirting (2004)
Scent for Wire Harp (2007)
Peggy Glanville-Hicks
 Harp Sonata (1953)
Félix Godefroid
Carnaval de Venise, Op.184
La danse des Sylphes
Etude de concert, Op. 193
Le coucou
La harpe éolienne
Alphonse Hasselmans
Gitana, Op. 21
La Source, Op. 44
Three Préludes, Opp. 51–3
Patrick Hawes
How Hill (2009)
Paul Hindemith
Harp Sonata (1939)
Alan Hovhaness
Nocturne (1935; rev. 1959)
Harp Sonata (1954)
Suite for Harp (1973)
Bertold Hummel
Gregorian Fantasy for Harpe solo op. 97b (1994)
Louis-Emmanuel Jadin
Fantaisie Concertante in G for harp, piano and orchestra
Karel Janovický
Sonata for Harp (2000)
Francois Couture
Songes (2015)
La suite du printemps (2020)
Sonate auprès de la rivière (2021)
Valeri Kikta
Ossian, suite for harp (1965)
Four poems of Osman (1969)
Two Pieces (1972)
Romantic Variations on a Theme by Lyudkevich (1978)
Sonata No. 1 Sonata Lamentosa (1980)
Sonata No. 2 Bylina Scales in E flat major (1982)
Fantasy on themes from P.I. Tchaikovsky's 'Pique Dame' (1982)
At the Smoldering Chimney, fantasy for harp (1983)
Jean-Baptiste Krumpholz
Harp Sonata, Op. 10 (c.1787)
Four Sonates non difficiles with optional violin or cello, Op. 12 (c.1787)
Four Sonates chantantes with optional violin, Op.16 (c1788), no.3 ed. in T-B
Recueil de douze préludes et petits airs, Op. 2 (c. 1776)
Duo for two harps, Op. 5 (c. 1777)
Recueil contenant différens petits airs variés, 1 sonata and 1 petit duo for two harps, Op. 10 (c. 1787)
Théodore Labarre
Méthode complète pour le harpe (1844)
Fantaisies on operatic themes after Donizetti, Rossini and others
Numerous concert works
Fabien Lévy
Les deux ampoules d'un sablier peu à peu se comprennent
Peter Machajdík
Nell'autunno del suo abbraccio insonne (2003)
Flower full of Gardens (2010) 
Ulity (2014)
Rivers Connect (2019)
Benefits of Breathing (2020)
Fabio Mengozzi
Arabesque (2011)
Diario d'arpa (2011)
Poema della trasmigrazione (2012)
Romanza al cielo (2012)
Rosa (2012)
Crux (2012)
Novella (2013)
Moto fluttuante (2014)
Primavera, stormi frementi nel silenzio del tramonto (2021)
Estate, luce di stelle nella notte (2021)
Autunno, petali sopiti nel vento (2021)
Inverno, neve cadente nel gelo dell'alba (2021)
Shai Cohen
Nuance for Harp and Live electronics (2011)
I saw a rainbow in a puddle for amplified Harp and live electronics (2019)
Sergiu Natra
Sonatina
Prayer
A Book of Hebrew Songs
Ballade millenaire
Cantosonata (2011)
Lior Navok
East of the Cane Fields
Charles Oberthür
Reminiscences de Suisse, Op. 3
Souvenir de Genève, Op. 4
Souvenir de Londres. Fantaisie et variations brillantes sur un thême original, Op. 26
Souvenir de Boulogne. Nocturne, Op. 30
La Belle Emmeline. Impromptu, Op. 51
Trois Mélodies religieuses, Op. 52
Gems of German Songs. Twelve Recreations, Op. 61
Le Désir, Op. 65
Au bord de la mer. Nocturne, Op. 68
Bel chiaro di luna. Impromptu, Op. 91
La Sylphide. Morceau caractéristique, Op. 150
Seaside Rambles. Four Musical Sketches, Op. 158
Le Réveil des elfes. Morceau caractéristique, Op. 181
A Fairy Legend, Op. 182
Erin, oh! Erin! Mélodie irlandaise favorite, Op. 183
Conte de fées. Caprice, Op. 301
Le Papillon. Caprice, Op. 317
Henri O'Kelly
Prélude pour harpe chromatique (1900)
Rêverie pastorale (1900)
Francesco Petrini
Sonatas for harp (violin ad lib)
6 as Op. 1 (1769)
6 as Op. 3
2 as Op. 4
Third book, Op. 9
Fourth Book, Op. 10 (c.1780)
1 as Op. 39
4 as Op. 40 (1801)
Airs with variations
First collection, Op. 2 (1774)
Second collection, Op. 8 (1774)
Seventh collection, Op. 15 (1779)
Op. 16 (1779)
Op. 17 (c. 1780-5)
Airs, ouvertures, sonata movements, published in Delamanière at Delaplanque (c.1790)
Variations on 'Le Réveil du peuple de Gaveaux', 'Vive Henri IV', 'Bataille du Wagram', etc. published separately
Gabriel Pierné
Impromptu-caprice, Op. 9 (1885)
Anna-Maria Ravnopolska-Dean
Improvisation (2003)
The Turtle's Castle (2003)
Four Compositions for Harp on Haiku Poetry (2003)
Suite of 8 Dances: Laendler, Tango, Fandango, Horo, Kazachok, Arabian dance, Pavane (2004)
Fantasy on Verdi's Opera 'La Traviata' (2005)
Two Haiku Pieces on Basho (2006)
The Mystic Trumpeter (2006)
Five Haiku Pieces 'Solo Honkadorae Renga' (2006)
Henriette Renié
Contemplation (1902)
Concerto pour harpe et orchestre (in C minor) (1901)
Légende d'après 'Les Elfes' de Leconte de Lisle
Six Pièces (Conte de Noël, Recueillement, Air de danse, Invention dans le Style ancien, Rêverie, Gavotte)
Contemplation
Danse des lutins
Feuillets d'album (Esquisse, Danse d'autrefois, Angelus)
Pièce symphonique en trois episodes
Promenade matinale, deux pièces pour Harpe
Deux pièces symphoniques (Élégie, Danse caprice)
Ballade fantastique d'après 'Le Cœur révélateur' d'Edgar Poë)
2e Ballade pour harpe
Andante Religioso
Marcel Grandjany
Rhapsodie pour la harpe(1922 or earlier)
Joaquín Rodrigo
Impromptu (1959)
Nino Rota
Sarabanda e Toccata
Sonata
Albert Roussel
Impromptu, Op. 21 (1919)
John Rutter
Many choral hymns and anthems with harp accompaniment, w/w/o orchestral accompaniment
Kaija Saariaho
Fall (Maa)
Camille Saint-Saëns
Fantaisie, Op. 95
Salvatore Sciarrino
Addio a Trachis
Leon Schidlowsky
Five Pieces for Harp
Michael Seltenreich
Inertia for Harp
Dave Smith
A propos de rien (1999)
Juan María Solare
White horse falling asleep (2012)
Progressive Empathy (2022)
Louis Spohr
Fantasia in C minor, Op. 35 (1807)
Variations on Méhul's 'Je suis encore dans mon printemps', Op. 36 (1807)
Variations in E, WoO 29 (1808), lost
Germaine Tailleferre
Le Petit livre de harpe de Madame Tardieu
Sonate
Sonata alla Scarlatti
Josef Tal
Intrada (1959)
Structure (1961)
Concerto for harp & electronic music (1971/1980)
Dispute (1989)
Marcel Tournier
Berceuse
Berceuse Russe, Op. 40
Ce que chante la pluie d'automne, Op. 49
Deux Petites pièces
Deuxième Sonatine, Op. 45
Encore une Bôite à Musique, Op. 43
Étude de concert (Au matin)
Féerie
Fresque Marine, Op. 46
Images, Op. 29 Suite 1
Images, Op. 31 Suite 2
Images, Op. 35 Suite 3
Images, Op. 39 Suite 4
Jazz Band, Op. 33
Pièces nègres, Op. 41
Quatre Préludes, Op. 16
Six Noëls, Op. 32
Sonatine, Op. 30
Thème et variations
Vers la source dans le bois

Two or more harps

Alan Hovhaness
Island of the Mysterious Bells (4 harps)
Peter Machajdík
Whilst You Dreamt (2003)
Fabio Mengozzi
Symbolon (two harps)
Francesco Petrini
Duo for two harps (or harp and piano), Op. 7 (1773?)
Duo for two harps (violin, basso continuo, ad lib), Op. 31
Timothy Salter
Three Intermezzi (two harps)
Carlos Salzedo
Pentangle (two harps)
Juan María Solare
Plenitude in rotation (four harps) (2012)
Karlheinz Stockhausen
Freude (Joy), for two harps (Klang: zweite Stunde, 2005)
John Thomas
Scenes of Childhood, for 2 harps (1863)
Cambria, for 2 harps (1863)
Marcel Tournier
Quatre Préludes, Op. 16 (2 harps)
Sergiu Natra
Sonata for Four Harps
Leon Schidlowsky
Duetto

Chamber works

William Alwyn
Suite for Oboe and Harp (1944)
Stefan Beyer
Die schreien Salz, for bassoon, trumpet, trombone, percussion, harp, violin, and violoncello (2008/2009)
François-Adrien Boieldieu
Duos for harp and piano
No. 1 (1796)
No. 2 (1796)
No. 3 (c.1800), lost
Air and nine variations for harp and piano (1803), lost
Jeremy Beck 
Ghosts for flute and harp (1985)
Sonata for flute, violin, cello and harp (1986)
Songs Without Words for flute and harp (1998)
Howard J. Buss 
Alpine Spring for flute and harp (2008)
Inner Quest for flute and harp (2011)
Saint Francis and the Animals for flute, clarinet and harp (2013)
Seaside Reflections for flute and harp (1993)
Seaside Reflections for oboe and harp (1993)
Seaside Reflections for clarinet and harp (2011)
Zoom for bass trombone (or tuba) and harp (2011)
Garrett Byrnes; (b. 1971); Garrett Byrnes website
Moon Songs for soprano and harp (2011)
Villanelle for violin and harp (2006)
Elliott Carter
Trilogy for oboe and harp (1992)
Luimen for trumpet, trombone, vibraphone, mandolin, guitar, and harp (1997)
Mosaic for flute (doubling piccolo and alto flute), oboe (doubling English horn), clarinet (doubling bass clarinet), harp, violin, viola, cello, and double bass (2004)
Trije glasbeniki for flute, bass clarinet, and harp (2011)
Jeremy Cavaterra
Trio for Harp, Flute, and Viola (2012)
Capriccio Concertante for clarinet, string quartet, bass, and harp (2017)
Julian Cochran
Artemis for violin, cor anglais and harp
Gilad Cohen
Trio for a Spry Clarinet, Weeping Cello and Ruminating Harp (2010)
Firefly Elegy for clarinet, violin, viola, cello, and harp (2017)
Francois Couture
La suite foraine for Flute, viola and Harp (2015)
La suite au chalet for Oboe and Harp (2019)
La suite de la table d'hôte for Violin and Harp (2021)
Sonate aux arômes boisés for Viola and Harp (2021)
Sonate aux champs for Viola and Harp (2021)
Jean-Michel Damase
Trio for flute, cello and harp (1947)
Trio for flute, viola and harp (1947)
Quintet for flute, harp and string trio, Op. 2 (1948)
Sonata for clarinet and harp (1984)
Second Sonata for flute and harp
Adage for trumpet and harp
Claude Debussy
Music for Chansons de Bilitis for two flutes, two harps, and celesta, L. 96 (1900-1)
Danses sacrée et profane for harp and string quintet, L. 103 (1904)
Sonata for harp, flute, and viola, L. 137 (1915)
Trio Sonata for flute, viola, and harp (2012)
Joël-François Durand
Le Tombeau de Rameau for flute, viola and harp (2008)
Jan Ladislav Dussek
Duo in F for harp and piano, C. 63 (c.1789)
Duetto in F for harp and piano, C. 102 (1794)
Two pieces for harp, violin, and cello (1797)
No. 1 in E flat, C. 147
No. 2 in B flat, C. 148
Duet in E flat for harp and piano, C. 170 (1799)
Two Duettinos for harp and piano (c.1802)
No. 1 in C, C. 189
No. 2 in F, C. 190
Three Duos concertants for harp and piano
No. 1 in B flat, C. 234 (1810)
No. 2 in E flat, C. 239 (1811)
No. 3 in F, C. 243 (1811)
Vladimír Godár
Barcarolle, for violin (or cello), strings, harp and harpsichord (1993/1995)
La Canzona refrigerativa dell arpa di Davide (David's Refreshing Harp Song), for cello & harp (1999)
Sofia Gubaidulina
Garden of Joy and Sorrow, for harp, flute and viola
Lou Harrison
The Perilous Chapel, for harp, flute, cello and percussion (1948)
Patrick Hawes
Earth Rise (2011) for harp and oboe
Reflexionem (2006) for harp and cello
Gilad Hochman
Prayer without Words for soprano saxophone and Harp (2018)
Arthur Honegger
Petite suite for flute, viola and harp
Alan Hovhaness
The World Beneath the Sea 
No. 1, for harp, alto saxophone, vibraphone, timpani and gong (1954)
No. 2, for harp, clarinet, timpani bells (chimes or glockenspiel), and double bass (1963)
Koke no Niwa, for English horn (or B flat clarinet), 2 percussion and harp (1954; rev. 1960)
The Garden of Adonis, for flute and harp (or piano) (1971)
Firdausi, for clarinet, harp and percussion (1972)
Spirit of Tress, for harp and guitar (1983)
Starry Night, for flute, xylophone and harp
Sonata for flute and harp (1987)
Sno Qualmie, for harp, clarinet, timpani, chimes, and double bass
Bertold Hummel
Duo concertante for Harp and Violoncello Op.33 (1968)
Airat Ichmouratov
Trio for Harp, Viola and Flute "Fujin's Dream" Op.58 (2018)
Nigel Keay
Terrestrial Mirror for flute, viola & harp (2005)
Valeri Kikta
Antique Visions for clarinet and harp (1977)
Sonata for violin and harp (1998)
Jean-Baptiste Krumpholz
6 harp sonatas with violin, Op. 1 (c.1775)
4 harp sonatas with violin, double bass, and two horns, Op. 3 (c.1776)
6 harp sonatas, Op. 8 (c. 1780), nos. 1-5 with violin or flute
Collection de pièces de différens genres distribuées en 6 sonates with piano, Opp. 13–14 (c.1788)
4 Sonates en forme de scènes de différens caractères with piano, Op. 15 (c.1788)
3 Sonates … dont la 1er en forme de scène with violin, Op. 17 (c.1789)
2 Sonates en forme de scènes with piano, Op. 18 (c.1789)
Andante for harp and violin, Op. 19 (c.1789)
Théodore Labarre
Duos for harp and horn
Trios for harp, horn, and bassoon, Op. 6
Grand duo du couronnement for harp and piano, Op. 104 (1841)
Numerous salon pieces for harp and piano
Romance for violin and harp
Lowell Liebermann
Sonata for flute and harp, Op. 56 (1996)
Raymond Luedeke
The Moon in the Labyrinth for harp and string quartet (or string orch.)
The Lyre of Orpheus for harp and string quartet (or for harp duo)
Fairy Tales for harp and flute (also piccolo)
Five Pieces for harp, flute, and cello
Aurora for flute and harp
Bohuslav Martinů
Musique de Chambre No. 1 (clarinet, violin, viola, cello, piano)
Felix Mendelssohn
The Evening Bell in B flat for harp and piano MWV Q 20 (1829)
Fabio Mengozzi
Phoenix (violin and harp)
Ousia (harp and piano)
Ousia II (flute, cello, harp, piano)
Auriga (harp and piano)
Sergiu Natra
Music For Violin and Harp
Music For Harp and Three Brass Instruments (trumpet, trombone, & French horn)
Music for Nicanor (harp, flute, clarinet & string quartet)
Commentaires sentimentaux (flute, viola and harp)
Two Sacred Songs (soprano, violin, cello, harp & organ)
Ancient Walls (trombone & harp)
Ancient Walls (horn & harp)
Trio in One Movement nr. 2 (2 French horns & harp)
Deux poemes (voice & harp)
Sonata for Harp and String Quartet
Divertimento for Harp and String Quartet with D.B.
Divertimento for Harp and String Quartet without D.B.
Divertimento for Harp and String Orch.
Lior Navok
Al Mishkavi Baleylot, for soprano and harp
Quartet for flute, clarinet, bassoon and harp
Veiled Echoes, for flute, viola and harp
Charles Oberthür
Souvenir à Schwalbach, Op. 42 for horn and harp
Mon séjour à Darmstadt, Op. 90 for horn and harp
Trio, Op. 139 for violin, cello, harp
Trio, Op. 162 for violin, cello, harp (1867)
Orpheus, Op. 253 for harp and piano
Sweet Dreams, Op. 300 for clarinet and piano
Elias Parish Alvars
Grande fantaisie brillante for harp and piano (1838), based on themes from Anna Bolena, La sonnambula and Lucia di Lammermoor, composed with Carl Czerny
Francesco Petrini
Airs with variations
Third collection (1774) for harp, violin, and oboe
Fourth and fifth collections, Opp. 12–13 (c. 1778) for harp, violin, and oboe
Sixth collection, Op. 14 (1778) for harp, bassoon, and cello
3 preludes for harp and basso continuo
Maurice Ravel
Introduction and Allegro for harp, flute, clarinet, and string quartet (1905)
Albert Roussel
Sérénade for flute, string trio, and harp, Op. 30 (1925)
Camille Saint-Saëns
Fantasie for violin and harp, Op. 124
Timothy Salter
Mosaics for flute/picolo, viola and harp
Carlos Salzedo
The Enchanted Isle (1918)
Harp Concerto No. 1 (1926)
Harp Concerto No. 2 (1953)
Leo Smit
Trio pour Flute, Alto et harpe
Dave Soldier
Dean Swift's Satyrs for the Very Very Young for harp, viola, flute and voice (2011)
Louis Spohr – in many of these works, the harp was to be tuned down a semitone and the music written a semitone higher
Sonatas for harp and violin
No. 1 in C minor, WoO 23 (1805)
No. 2 in B flat, Op. 16 (1806)
No. 3 in E minor/F minor, WoO 27 (c.1806)
No. 4 in D/E flat, Op. 113 (1806)
No. 5 in D/E flat, Op. 114 (1811)
No. 6 in G/A flat, Op. 115 (1809)
No. 7 in G/A flat, WoO 36 (1819), lost
Sonata movement for harp and violin in G, WoO 24 (1805), incomplete
Introduction in G for harp and violin, WoO 25 (1805)
Trio in E minor/F minor for violin, cello, and harp, WoO 28 (1806)
Rondo in E minor/F minor for violin, cello, and harp, WoO 33 (1813), lost
Fantasia on Themes by Handel and Vogler in B minor/C minor–A/B flat, Op. 118 (1814)
Igor Stravinsky
Epitaphium for flute, clarinet, and harp (1959)
Toru Takemitsu
Eucalypts II, for flute, oboe and harp (1971)
Toward the Sea III, for alto flute and harp (1989)
And then I knew 'twas Wind, for flute, viola and harp (1992)
Josef Tal
Lament, for violoncello & harp (1947)
Hora, for violoncello & harp (1949)
Duo for trombone & harp (1989)
Marcel Tournier
Nocturne (cello, harp and organ)
La Lettre du jardinier (high voice and harp)
Deux préludes romantiques Op. 17 (violin and harp)

Concertante works

Concertos

Mark Adamo
Four Angels: Concerto for Harp and Orchestra (2007)
Kalevi Aho
Mearra, chamber concerto for harp and 13 strings (2016)
Johann Georg Albrechtsberger
4 harp concertinos (1772)
Harp Concerto (1773)
Elias Parish Alvars
Three concertos
Two concertinos, one for solo harp, one for two harps
William Alwyn
Lyra Angelica, concerto for harp and string orchestra (1954)
Henk Badings
Harp Concerto (1967)
Nicolas-Charles Bochsa
Concerto militar
Concerto pour harpe et orchestre No. 1 en ré mineur, Op. 15
François-Adrien Boieldieu
Harp Concerto in C Major (1801)
Ann Carr-Boyd
Fantasy for Harp and Orchestra (1996)
Paul Constantinescu
Harp Concerto
Barry Conyngham
Cloudlines: Concerto for harp and orchestra (1990)
Henry Cowell
Harp Concerto, L. 947 (1965)
Jean-Michel Damase
Ballade pour harpe et orchestre à cordes
Concertino pour harpe et instruments à cordes
Carl Ditters von Dittersdorf
Concerto for Harp
Ernő Dohnányi
Concertino for harp and chamber orchestra (1952)
Jan Ladislav Dussek
Harp Concerto in E flat, C. 53/265 (1789)
Harp Concerto in F, C. 78/266 (1792)
Harp Concerto in C, C. 129/267 (1795)
The Favourite Concerto in F, C. 158 (1798?)
Harp Concerto in B flat, C. 264 (1813), lost
Ernst Eichner
Harp Concerto in C (1769)
Harp Concerto in D (1771?)
Alberto Ginastera
Harp Concerto, Op. 25 (1956)
Reinhold Glière
Harp Concerto in E flat, Op. 74 (1938)
Radamés Gnattali
Concerto for harp and string orchestra (1957)
George Frideric Handel
Concerto in B-flat major for harp, Op. 4, No. 6, HWV 294 (1738)
Patrick Hawes
Highgrove Suite for harp and string orchestra
Jennifer Higdon
Harp Concerto (2018)
Alun Hoddinott
Harp Concerto, Op. 11 (1957)
Karl Jenkins
Over the Stone, a concerto for two harps (2008)
André Jolivet
Concerto for harp and chamber orchestra (1952)
Joseph Jongen
Concerto for Harp and Orchestra, Op.129 (1944)
Jean-Baptiste Krumpholz
Harp Concertos Nos. 1 and 2, Op. 4 (c. 1777)
Harp Concertos Nos. 3 and 4, Op. 6 (c. 1777)
Harp Concerto No. 5, Op. 7 (c. 1778)
Harp Concerto No. 6, Op. 9 (c. 1785)
William Lovelock
Rhapsody Concerto for Harp and Orchestra (1981)
William Mathias
Harp Concerto, Op. 50 (1970)
Marjan Mozetich
Concerto for Two Harps and Orchestra, The Passion of Angels (1995 )
Darius Milhaud
Harp Concerto, Op. 323 (1953)
Sergiu Natra
Divertimento for Harp (solo) and String Orch.
Charles Oberthür
Harp Concertino, Op. 175 (c.1863)
Giovanni Paisiello
Harp Concerto in A major
Francesco Petrini
Two harp concertos arranged from works by "Mr. Bach" and "Mr. J.-B. Davaux", Op. 18 (c.1782)
Harp Concerto No. 1, Op. 25 (1786)
Harp Concerto No. 3, Op. 27 (1793)
Harp Concerto No. 4 in B flat, Op. 29 (1793)
Gabriel Pierné
Konzertstück, Op.39 (1901)
Einojuhani Rautavaara
Harp Concerto (2000)
Henriette Renié
Harp Concerto (1901)
Carl Reinecke (1824–1910)
Harp Concerto in E Minor, Opus 182 (1884)
Joaquín Rodrigo
Concierto serenata (1952)
Nino Rota
Harp Concerto (1947)
R. Murray Schafer
Harp Concerto (1987)
Leo Smit
Concertino pour harpe et orchestre (1933)
Leo Sowerby
Concerto for Harp and Small Orchestra, H. 123 (1916/1919)
John Thomas
Two harp concertos, including the Concerto in E flat, the only work by a Welsh composer to be performed (1852) during the first hundred years of the history of the Royal Philharmonic Society
Germaine Tailleferre
Concertino for Harp and Orchestra (1927)
Boris Tishchenko
 Concerto for Harp and Chamber Orchestra, Op. 69 (1977)
Geirr Tveitt
Harp Concerto No. 1 (Lost)
Harp Concerto No. 2 "Concerto Eroico" op.170 (1957)
Heitor Villa-Lobos
Harp Concerto (1953)
Georg Christoph Wagenseil
Concerto for Harp and strings in F, WWV 281 (1761)
John Williams
On Willows and Birches (2009)
Mario Zafred
Concerto for Harp and Orchestra (1956?)

Other concertante works
Luciano Berio
Chemins I on Sequenza II (1964)
Garrett Byrnes (b. 1971)
Capriccio Tempestoso (2010)
André Caplet
Légende (1908) after Edgar Allan Poe's "The Masque of the Red Death," revised as Conte fantastique for harp and string quartet (1922-3)
Don Gillis
Rhapsody for Harp and Orchestra (1946)
Valeri Kikta
Frescos of the St. Sofia Cathedral of Kiev for harp and orchestra (1974)
Scottish Suite on Scottish Themes from 16th – 18th centuries for two harps and orchestra (2000)
Jean-Baptiste Krumpholz
Symphonies Nos. 1 and 2 for harp and orchestra, Op. 11 (1787)
Théodore Labarre
Fantaisie, Op. 101 (1841)
Charles Oberthür
Macbeth Overture, Op. 60 (1852)
Loreley, legend, Op. 180
Gabriel Pierné
Concertstück, Op. 39 (1903)
Walter Piston
Capriccio for Harp and String Orchestra (1963)
Einojuhani Rautavaara
Ballade for harp and strings (1973/1981)
Ferdinand Ries
Overture Bardique [concertante] for 6 harps (in 2 parts) and orchestra WoO 24 (1815)
Joaquín Rodrigo
Sones en la Giralda (1963)
Camille Saint-Saëns
Morceau de concert in G, Op. 154 (1918)
Arnold Schoenberg
Notturno for Strings and Harp (1895-96) 
Toru Takemitsu
Toward the Sea II, for alto flute, harp and string orchestra II (1981)

Concertos with other solo instruments
William Alwyn
Concerto for Oboe, harp and strings (1944)
Kalevi Aho
Concerto for Cor anglais, Harp and Orchestra (2014)
Henry Cowell
Duo concertante for flute, harp, and orchestra, L. 894 (1961)
Hans Werner Henze
Doppio Concerto for oboe, harp & strings (1966)
Paul Hindemith
Konzertmusik for brass, harp, and piano, Op. 49 (1930)
Concerto for woodwinds, harp, and orchestra (1949)
Anna Jalkéus
 Concerto for jazz voice, harp and orchestra "The Rise of Estrogenia" (2017)
Lowell Liebermann
Concerto for Flute, Harp and Orchestra, Op.48 (1995)
Frank Martin
Petite symphonie concertante for harp, harpsichord, piano and double string orchestra, op.54 (1944)
Fabio Mengozzi
Auriga II (piano, harp and string orchestra)
Wolfgang Amadeus Mozart
Concerto for flute and harp in C, K. 299 (1778)
Louis Spohr
Concertante for violin and harp in G, WoO 13 (1806)
Concertante for violin and harp in E minor, WoO 14 (1807)

References

Compiled from the Works Lists of the composers in The New Grove Dictionary of Music and Musicians, ed. S. Sadie and J. Tyrrell (London: Macmillan, 2001).
Australian Music Centre Catalogue www.amcoz.org